1,2,4-Butanetriol is a clear or slightly yellow, odorless, hygroscopic, flammable, viscous liquid. It is an alcohol with three hydrophilic alcoholic hydroxyl groups. It is similar to glycerol and erythritol. It is chiral, with two possible enantiomers.

1,2,4-Butanetriol is used in the manufacture of butanetriol trinitrate (BTTN), an important military propellant.

1,2,4-Butanetriol is also used as a precursor for two cholesterol-lowering drugs, Crestor and Zetia, which are derived from D-3,4-dihydroxybutanoic acid, by using 3-hydroxy-gamma-butyrolactone as a chiral synthon
It is used as one of the monomers for manufacture of some polyesters and as a solvent.

1,2,4-Butanetriol can be prepared synthetically by several different methods such as hydroformylation of glycidol and subsequent reduction of the product, sodium borohydride reduction of esterified malic acid, or catalytic hydrogenation of malic acid. However, of an increasing importance is the biotechnological synthesis using genetically engineered Escherichia coli and Pseudomonas fragi bacteria.

References

Triols
Monomers
Alcohol solvents